Flabellina ilidioi is a species of sea slug, an aolid nudibranch, a marine gastropod mollusk in the family Flabellinidae.

References

Flabellinidae